The 1896 Massachusetts gubernatorial election was held on November 3, 1896. Acting Governor Roger Wolcott, a  Republican, was re-elected to a full term in office, defeating Democratic U.S. Representative George Fred Williams.

General election

Results

See also
 1896 Massachusetts legislature

References

Governor
1896
Massachusetts
November 1896 events